Nosferatu pantostictus, the Chairel cichlid, is a species of cichlid native to the Panuco River drainage of Mexico's Atlantic coast where it is mostly found in moderately fast flowing rivers, slightly brackish, murky lakes and lagoons along the coast. It reaches a maximum size of  SL though most do not exceed  TL. This species can also be found in the aquarium trade.

References

pantostictus
Freshwater fish of Mexico
Endemic fish of Mexico
Pánuco River
Natural history of San Luis Potosí
Natural history of Tamaulipas
Natural history of Veracruz
Cichlid fish of Central America
Endangered fish
Fish described in 1983
Taxa named by Jeffrey N. Taylor
Taxa named by Robert Rush Miller